Desolation of Eden is the debut studio album by American deathcore band Chelsea Grin. It was released February 16, 2010 through Artery Recordings. Upon its release, the album reached 21 on the Top Heatseekers chart. Desolation of Eden features two re-recordings of the songs "Cheyne Stokes" and "Recreant" which were originally on the band's self-titled EP.

Style
Alex Henderson of AllMusic described the style of music on the album as deathcore; a "noisy, caustic, abrasive mixture of metalcore and death metal."

Reception

AllMusic awarded the album three stars out of five, noting that it was not an album for everyone, but an audience "who do appreciate highly technical deathcore will find Desolation of Eden to be a likable (if less than stellar) contribution to metal's lunatic fringe."

Track listing

Personnel
Chelsea Grin
 Alex Koehler – vocals
 Michael Stafford – guitar
 Dan Jones – guitar
 Jake Harmond – guitar
 David Flinn – bass guitar
 Andrew Carlston – drums

Production
 Produced by Timothy Lambesis
 Engineered & mixed by Daniel Castleman
 Mastered by Stephan Hawkes
 Management by Mike Milford & Eric Rushing (The Artery Foundation)
 Booking by Nick Storch

References

External links

2010 debut albums
Chelsea Grin albums
Artery Recordings albums